The Victor Cullen Center, Old Administration Building is a historic building located at Sabillasville, Frederick County, Maryland, United States. It is a -story, stone and frame Colonial Revival style structure located on a hillside with four stone chimneys, two on each gable end. The building was built originally to house the Maryland Tuberculosis Sanitorium, the first state sponsored institution of its type in Maryland.  It was designed by the architectural firm Wyatt & Nolting.

The Old Administration Building of the Victor Cullen Center was listed on the National Register of Historic Places in 1990.

See also
Victor Cullen School Power House, also NRHP-listed

References

External links
, including photo from 2006, at Maryland Historical Trust

Hospital buildings completed in 1907
Hospital buildings on the National Register of Historic Places in Maryland
Buildings and structures in Frederick County, Maryland
Government buildings completed in 1907
Colonial Revival architecture in Maryland
Tuberculosis sanatoria in the United States
National Register of Historic Places in Frederick County, Maryland